Judy Stiegler (born July 4, 1953) is an American Democratic politician who served in the Oregon House of Representatives from 2009 until 2011.

Biography
Stiegler was born in Montrose, Colorado in 1953. She graduated from the University of Oregon with a Bachelor of Science in 1975, and from Lewis and Clark College with a Juris Doctor in 1978. Stiegler served on the board of the Bend-La Pine School District from 1989 until 1992, and became President of the National Association of State Boards of Education in 2000. She defeated incumbent Republican State Representative Chuck Burley in 2008. Stiegler ran for reelection in 2010 but was defeated by Republican Jason Conger.

Personal life
Stiegler is married to Mike Dugan, and they have two children, Daniel and Molly. They attend First Presbyterian Church in Bend.

References

Living people
1953 births
Democratic Party members of the Oregon House of Representatives
Women state legislators in Oregon
Politicians from Bend, Oregon
People from Montrose, Colorado
University of Oregon alumni
Lewis & Clark Law School alumni
Oregon lawyers
American Presbyterians
School board members in Oregon
21st-century American politicians
21st-century American women politicians